There are 33 traditional noble titles in the modern Kingdom of Tonga. They are all estate holders. Twenty titles were established by Siaosi Tupou I with the Constitution of 1875. In 1880 he added 11 more. Tupou II created the titles Lasike in 1894 and Veikune in 1903. Sālote Tupou III made in 1921 the title of Tupoutoʻa. In the beginning it was forbidden for a noble to have more than one title. Later this was made possible.

Some of the great chiefs who missed out on a noble's title (in 1910) were among others: ʻAlipate Mafileʻo of Kolomotuʻa, SA Sipu of Kolomotuʻa,  Iki Lolohea of Haʻapai (but later inherited the Fulivai), Tēvita Tapueluelu of Vavaʻu, SF Tafolo, Tēvita Ula Afuhaʻamango of Vavaʻu, Siosiua Niutupuʻivaha Kaho (but later inherited the Tuʻivakanō).

These unacknowledged chiefs were still lords in the traditional sense. However their influence slowly decreased with each passing generation. Queen Sālote acknowledged this in some of her public speeches by paying respect to the chiefs then a separate respect to the Nobles of the Crown as: «Highly respectful for the Chiefs is also Highly respectful for the nobles in this land».

In the 21st century King George Tupou V created eight new noble titles but with no hereditary lands. This title is to remain with them for their whole life known and is considered equivalent to the United Kingdom's practice of appointing Life Peers.

 Ramsay Robertson Dalgety (July 2008)
 Tevita Poasi Tupou (July 2008)
 Taniela Tufui (July 2008 – deceased)
 Matoto of Tuʻanekivale (30 December 2010)
 Tangi of Vaonukonuka (30 December 2010)
 Feleti Sevele ʻo Vailahi (30 December 2010)
 Madraiwiwi Tangatatonga (4 January 2011 – deceased)
 Sonatane Tuʻa Taumoepeau-Tupou (28 March 2011 – deceased)

Thirty-four nobles
A
 Ata
 ʻAhomeʻe

F
 Fakafānua
 Fakatulolo
 Fielakepa
 Fohe
 Fotofili
 David Fulivai
 Fusituʻa

K
 Kalaniuvalu

L
 Lasike
 Luani
 Lāvaka

M
 Malupō
 Maʻafu
 Māʻatu

N
 Niukapu
 Nuku

T
 Tangipā
 Tuita
 Tungī
 Tupoutoʻa
 Tuʻihaʻangana
 Tuʻihaʻateiho
 Tuʻilakepa
 Tuʻipelehake
 Tuʻivakanō
 Tuʻiʻāfitu

U
 'Ulukālala

V
 Vaea
 Vahaʻi
 Veikune
 Veʻehala

References

I.C. Campbell; Classical Tongan kingship; 1989
Margaret Hixon; Salote Queen of Paradise; 2000
Tonga Liuaki; Taufa'ahau, Tu'iha'apai; 2008